Chaetostoma nudirostre is a species of catfish in the family Loricariidae. It is native to South America, where it occurs in the Lake Valencia basin in Venezuela. The species reaches  in total length.

References

nudirostre